Pagurus sinuatus is a large species of hermit crab found in Australia and the Kermadec Islands. It is red or orange in colour with coloured bands on the legs and patches on the body.

Description
Pagurus sinuatus is a large species of hermit crab, and normally inhabits rounded gastropod shells. It is distinguished from other hermit crab species in Australia by its solid, hairy chelipeds (claw-bearing appendages), although there may be further undescribed species within its range. The hermit crab's body is orange and red, with patches of red or violet colour. The pereiopods (walking legs) are banded.

Distribution
Pagurus sinuatus is found in the intertidal zone along the coasts of the Australian states of New South Wales, South Australia, Victoria and Western Australia, and in the Kermadec Islands (New Zealand).

External links

Pagurus sinuatus in Marine Species Gallery

References

Hermit crabs
Crustaceans of Australia
Crustaceans described in 1858